Mount Hermon High School is located in Mount Hermon, Louisiana, United States. The high school is currently housed out of the same facility as the Mount Hermon elementary and junior high schools. The current principal is Dawn Seal.   The first Mount Hermon School, constructed in the mid-19th century, held classes in a log cabin near the Mount Hermon Cemetery. A new building was constructed for the school in 1885, and that structure is currently located in the Mile Branch Settlement at the Washington Parish Fairgrounds.

Overview
At Mt. Hermon School, the student body makeup is 52 percent male and 48 percent female, and the total minority enrollment is 34 percent. Mt. Hermon School is 1 of 3 high schools in the Washington Parish.

Notable alumni
Lionel Ott, former member of the Louisiana State Senate and the last New Orleans finance commissioner
Yun Young-sun (minister), USA name was Allen Yun. South Korean politicians. Agriculture and Forestry Minister of South Korea, in 1950.

See also
Washington Parish School Board

External links
Mount Hermon School website

Public high schools in Louisiana
Schools in Washington Parish, Louisiana